This is a list of people who have lived in Heilbronn, Germany.

 Gustav Schübler (1787–1834), scientist (meteorology)
 Heinrich Friedrich Füger (1751–1818), painter
 Wilhelm Waiblinger (1804–1830), poet and author
 Julius Robert von Mayer (1814–1878), physician and physicist, formulated the principle of mechanical equivalence
 Ludwig Pfau (1821–1894), poet and revolutionary
 Adolf Cluss (1825–1905), architect, builder of numerous public buildings in Washington D.C.
 Gustav von Schmoller (1838–1917), economist
 Wilhelm Maybach (1846–1929), engineer and motor vehicle pioneer, developed the first fast-running gasoline engine together with Gottlieb Daimler
 Friedrich Stolz (1860–1936), chemist, invented in 1897 a predecessor of aspirin
 Siegfried Gumbel (1874–1942), lawyer, alderman (DDP), since 1933 head of the Israelite High Councillor for Württemberg in Stuttgart, died in Dachau concentration camp
Theodor Heuss (1884–1963), politician, first President of the Federal Republic of Germany (1949 to 1959)
 Hellmuth Hirth (1886–1938), aviation pioneer, aircraft and airship builder
Richard Drauz (1894–1946) in Landsberg Lech (executed as a war criminal), headed up the NSDAP in the Heilbronn district
 Walter Kreiser (1898–1958), aircraft designer and journalist
Walter Vielhauer (1909–1986), politician (KPD)
 Joseph Asher (1921–1990), German-American rabbi
 Rolf Wütherich (1927–1981), passenger of the fatal car accident of James Dean
 Heinz A. Richter (born 1939), historian to the specialty Greece and Cyprus
 Dieter Schwarz (born 1939), entrepreneur and owner of the Schwarz-Gruppe. (Kaufland, Lidl)
 Rosemarie Haag Bletter (born 1939), German-American architectural historian
 Andrzej Seweryn (born 1946), Polish actor
 Jürgen Schreiber (born 1947), journalist
 Heide Rühle (born 1948), politician (Greens) MEP, Federal President of the Greens 1990–1991
 Thomas Roth (born 1951), journalist, retired TV-presenter Tagesthemen 
 Freddy Sahin-Scholl (born 1953 as Freddy Scholl), singer and composer
 Michael Wittmann (born 1956), musicologist
 Falk Struckmann (born 1958), opera singer (baritone)
 Joachim Schlör (born 1960), professor, author of Jewish history
 Thomas Strobl (born 1960), politician (CDU) Member of Bundestag 
 Michael Georg Link (born 1963), politician (FDP) Member of Bundestag
 Michael Wenczel (born 1977), football player
 Sibel Kekilli (born 1980), German actress
 Michael Hackert (born 1981), professional ice hockey player NHL
 Corey Mapes (born 1992), hockey player
 Daniel Fischbuch (born 1993), hockey player

Other notable residents

 Martinus von Biberach (d. 1498), theologian, writer of famous epitaph
 Christian Friedrich Duttenhofer (1742–1814), theologian, pastor and prelate in Heilbronn
 Karl Mayer (1786–1870), poet, lived for a time in Heilbronn
 Louis Mayer (1791–1843), landscape painter lived for a time in Heilbronn
 Carl Heinrich Theodor Knorr (1800–1875), founder of the food business Knorr
 Alexander Bruckmann (1806–1852), historical and portrait painter, lived for a time in Heilbronn
 Gustav Rümelin (1815–1889), politician, lived and worked temporarily in Heilbronn
 Kilian von Steiner (1833–1903), banker, was lawyer in Heilbronn
 Max Eyth (1836–1906), writer, studied in Heilbronn
 Karl Nicolai (1839–1892) German magistrate and politician, from 1881 onwards Official notary in Heilbronn
 Max Cramer (1859–1933), teacher and genealogist in Heilbronn
 Theophil Wurm (1868–1953), prelate of Heilbronn 1927–29
 Ernst August Wagner (1874–1938), mass murderer, convicted and temporarily detained in Heilbronn
 Ernst Jaeckh (1875–1959), 1902–1912 editor of Neckar-Zeitung
 Oskar Dirlewanger (1895–1945), deputy director since 1933 of the Heilbronner labor office, later Waffen-SS officer and war criminal
 Emanuel H. Bronner (1908–1997), maker of Dr. Bronner's castile soap
 Walter Vielhauer (1909–1986), politician, mayor
 Marla Glen (born 1960), singer, living in Heilbronn since 1998

 
Heilbronn, notable people of
Heilbronn